The 1974 British National Track Championships were a series of track cycling competitions held from late July to early August 1974 at the Leicester Velodrome. Reg Harris won the professional pursuit title aged 54.

Medal summary

Men's Events

Women's Events

References

1974 in British sport
July 1974 sports events in the United Kingdom
August 1974 sports events in the United Kingdom